ZSI can refer to:

Zentrum für Soziale Innovation, Vienna (Austria)
Zoological Survey of India, Calcutta (India)
Zoological Society of Ireland